The Nokia N76 is a multimedia 3G Smartphone made by Nokia. It was introduced at the Las Vegas CES 2007 in January 2007 and was launched on 5 May 2007 with a sales price of 390 EUR. It is advertised as "The computer done beautifully" and as a "multimedia computer". It is also the slimmest Nseries phone to date, following many trends such as mirrored exterior screen and Motorola RAZR metal keypad. Hardware-wise the N76 bases off a platform by Freescale, being a first of kind in the family of “cheap” 3G smartphones. In fact the difference between the OMAP2420 and this Freescale CPU, is the lack of a graphics accelerator.

The phone was originally released without stereo bluetooth, but a later firmware update v30.0.015 adds A2DP and AVRCP bluetooth profiles. There are also numerous stability improvements and bug fixes as well as new features including the inclusion of Nokia Maps and a new search feature in active standby.

The N76 is among the more rarer Nokia devices and they go for relatively high prices in the second hand market.

Specifications

See also 
 List of Nokia products

External links 
 Official Nokia N76 website
 Nokia N76 review by Mobile-Review
 Nokia N76 Review CNET.com.au
 Nokia N76 review on SubReview
 Nokia N76 Pictures and Review (in English)
 Nokia developers site 

Nokia Nseries